Musheerabad Jail was a correctional facility located in Musheerabad area of Hyderabad, India. The facility was demolished in 2003 and a Gandhi hospital and a Gandhi medical college were constructed in the same area.

Prior to its demolition, director Nagesh Kukunoor obtained a stay order for some time in order to complete filming of 3 Deewarein (2003).

References 

Prisons in Hyderabad, India
Defunct prisons in India
Buildings and structures demolished in 2003
Demolished buildings and structures in India